Universal Motown Republic Group (UMRG) was an umbrella label founded in 1999 by Universal Music Group to oversee the labels assigned to its unit. UMRG was formed in 1999 by pooling together Universal Records, Motown Records, and Republic Records, (the first of the three is now defunct), but which gave way to the current incarnations of those labels at the time, Universal Motown Records and Universal Republic Records.

Universal Motown Republic Group was one of the three Universal Music Group umbrella units in North America to deal primarily with mainstream pop, rock, and urban performers; the others being: The Island Def Jam Music Group and Interscope-Geffen-A&M. Barry Weiss served as Chairman & CEO of the Company. In the summer of 2011, changes were made at the Universal Motown Republic Group umbrella: Motown Records was separated from Universal Motown Records (causing it to shut down and transfer its artists to either Motown Records or Universal Republic Records) and the umbrella label and merged into The Island Def Jam Music Group, making Universal Republic Records a stand-alone label and shutting down Universal Motown Republic Group.

Current Universal Motown Republic Group Labels

Universal Motown Records
Casablanca Records 
Cash Money Records
Young Money Entertainment
SRC Records
Loud Records
Rowdy Records
Custard Records
Ecstatic Peace!
Derrty Entertainment

Universal Republic Records
Casablanca Records
Republic Nashville
Next Plateau Entertainment
Chamillitary Entertainment
Serjical Strike Records
Tuff Gong
Brushfire Records
Lava Records
ANTI-

Artists

References

External links
 

Defunct record labels of the United States
New York (state) record labels
Universal Records
Motown
Republic Records
Record labels established in 1999
Record labels disestablished in 2011
Labels distributed by Universal Music Group
1999 establishments in New York City